Pierre Mercier (born June 7, 1982 in Fond Cochon, Haiti) is a Haitian former professional footballer who played as a defender. In 2008, he made six appearances for the Haiti national team, playing in the 2010 FIFA World Cup qualifiers. He also holds French citizenship.

External links
 

1982 births
Living people
Association football defenders
Haitian footballers
Haiti international footballers
Louhans-Cuiseaux FC players
FC Gueugnon players
Luzenac AP players
AS Moulins players
Balma SC players
Toulouse Rodéo FC players
Haitian expatriate footballers
Haitian expatriate sportspeople in Switzerland
Expatriate footballers in Switzerland
Haitian expatriate sportspeople in France
Expatriate footballers in France
Montauban FCTG players